Descamps is a French surname. Notable people with the surname include:

 Béatrice Descamps (born 1951), French politician and a former member of the Senate of France
 Édouard Descamps (1847–1933), Belgian jurist and politician
 Françoise Descamps-Crosnier (born 1955), member of the National Assembly of France
 Guillaume Descamps (1779-1858), French painter and engraver
 Jean-Baptiste Descamps (1714–1791), French writer on art and artists, and painter of village scenes
 Jean-Matthieu Descamps (born 1983), French football player 
 Joseph Jules Descamps (1820–1892), Belgian liberal politician
 Marie-Hélène Descamps (born 1938), French politician and Member of the European Parliament
 Marius Descamps (1924-1996), French entomologist
 Nathalie Descamps (born 1983), Belgian badminton player
 Patrick Descamps (born 1956), Belgian actor and stage director
 Pierre Descamps (1916–1992), Belgian politician and burgomaster
 Timo Descamps (born 1986), Belgian actor, voice actor and singer

See also
 Descamps 17, a French 1923 two seat reconnaissance fighter
 Descamps 27, a French 1919 two bay biplane
 Descamps v. United States, a 2013 case regarding prior offenses under the Armed Career Criminal Act

French-language surnames